Marx's Concept of Man is a 1961 book about Karl Marx's theory of human nature by the psychoanalyst Erich Fromm. The work sold widely thanks to the popularity of Marx's early writings, which was a product of the existentialism of the 1940s.

Summary

In Marx's Concept of Man, Erich Fromm provides a detailed analysis of Karl Marx's ideas about human nature and how those ideas informed his economic and political theories. Fromm shows how Marx's conception of man as a "species-being" who is fundamentally social and cooperative, rather than selfish and individualistic, shaped his vision of a society based on economic justice and equality. Fromm also critiques Marx's idea that religion is the "opiate of the people," arguing that it is actually an expression of man's alienation from himself and from others. Fromm concludes that Marx's greatest contribution was his recognition of the human need for self-actualization, which can only be met through social relationships based on love and solidarity.

Fromm provides selections from several of Marx's works. He also praises Reason and Revolution (1941), one of Herbert Marcuse's books on Georg Wilhelm Friedrich Hegel and Raya Dunayevskaya's Marxism and Freedom: From 1776 Until Today (1958). Fromm briefly discusses the Marxist philosopher György Lukács, noting that in History and Class Consciousness (1923) Lukács viewed Marx as an "eschatological thinker."

Reception
Marx's Concept of Man sold widely because the 1940s fashion for existentialism made Marx's early writings popular, according to the political scientist David McLellan, who considered Fromm's work a typical example of the favorable reception of the young Marx. Alexander Welsh reviewed Marx's Concept of Man in The New Republic. The philosopher Hazel Barnes compared Fromm's view of Marx and Marxism to that of the philosopher Jean-Paul Sartre. Rainer Funk wrote that the Economic and Philosophic Manuscripts of 1844 were published for the first time in English in Fromm's work, the translation by Bottomore having been done at Fromm's suggestion.

References

Bibliography
Books

 
 
 
 
 
 

Journals

  

1961 non-fiction books
American non-fiction books
English-language books
Books about Marxism
Works by Erich Fromm